John Lewis Hudson (born January 29, 1968) is a former American football center who played ten seasons in the National Football League for the New York Jets, the Philadelphia Eagles, and the Baltimore Ravens. He currently owns an animal farm on 700 acres in Paris, Tennessee.

History

Hudson played college football at Auburn University and was drafted in the eleventh round of the 1990 NFL Draft. He was a member of the 2000 World Champion Baltimore Ravens. After retiring from the professional sport, Hudson became a high-school football coach at Henry County High School in Paris, Tennessee; he also serves as a deacon and Sunday school teacher at the town's First Baptist Church. He was inducted into the Tennessee Football Hall of Fame in 2011.

References

1968 births
Living people
Players of American football from Memphis, Tennessee
American football centers
Auburn Tigers football players
Philadelphia Eagles players
New York Jets players
Baltimore Ravens players